A lemonade stand is a business that is commonly owned and operated by a child or children, to sell lemonade. The concept has become iconic of youthful summertime American culture to the degree that parodies and variations on the concept exist across media. The term may also be used to refer to stands that sell similar beverages like iced tea.

The stand may be a folding table, while the archetypical version is custom-made out of plywood or cardboard boxes. A paper sign on front advertises the lemonade stand.

Educational benefits 
Lemonade stands are often viewed as a way for children to experience business at a young age. The ideas of profit, economic freedom, and teamwork are often attributed to traits lemonade stands can instill. However, unlike a real business, they benefit from free labor and rent, and may have a lack of expenses.

Legality 
In some areas, lemonade stands are usually in technical violation of several laws, including operation without a business license or permit, lack of adherence to health codes, and sometimes child labor laws. 

Prosecutions of lemonade stand operations are extremely rare, but have been known to occur, typically to public outcry. As an example, a child's lemonade stand was shut down in the town of Overton, Texas in June 2015. When the mother tried to get a permit, she was told she would be required to have her kitchen inspected.

In 2018, Country Time created Legal-Ade, which pays up to $300 of the legal fees for lemonade stands fined in 2017 or 2018, or for 2018 permits.

The New York Legislature took up a bill in 2019 that, if passed, will explicitly make lemonade stands operated by minors legal and exempt from most regulations. As of that summer, fourteen U.S. states explicitly allow operation of a lemonade stand without a permit.

See also 
 List of lemonade topics

References 

Childhood in the United States
Business terms
Business models
Child labour
Americana
Lemonade